Mohammed ben Salem al-Ayouni, known as Jalaluddin al-Tunisi is a Tunisian Islamic militant and emir of the Tarablus province of the Islamic State of Iraq and the Levant in Libya.

History

He was born in 1982 in M'saken, a town in the Sousse Governorate of Tunisia. He emigrated to France in the 1990s and obtained French citizenship before returning to Tunisia in 2011 after the Tunisian Revolution.

In late 2011, he moved to Syria to participate in the civil war there. He joined the Islamic State of Iraq and the Levant in 2014 after the killing of the commander of the Ghoraba battalion. In the same year he appeared in one of the most well-known Islamic State videos called "Breaking the Border" in which he speaks alongside Abu Muhammad al-Adnani, the second most senior IS leader before his death.

In 2016 he was made the emir of the Islamic State of Iraq and the Levant Tarablus province in Libya. It is reported that he is very close to Islamic State leader Abu Bakr al-Baghdadi who believes he is able to win battles and maintain good relations with other Islamic groups in North Africa.

References

1982 births
Living people
Islamic State of Iraq and the Levant and France
Islamic State of Iraq and the Levant members
Tunisian Islamists
People from Sousse Governorate